Brassic may refer to:

 Brassic (TV series), British comedy series
 Boracic lint, medical dressing made from surgical lint
 "Brassic", Cockney rhyming slang for "skint" (i.e. penniless)